The 1974 Campeonato Brasileiro Série A, officially the Quarto Campeonato Nacional de Clubes, was the 18th edition of the Campeonato Brasileiro Série A.

Overview
It was contested by 40 teams, and Vasco da Gama won the championship.

First phase

Group A

Group B

Second phase

Group 1

Group 2

Group 3

Group 4

Third phase

Finals

Final standings

References
 1974 Campeonato Brasileiro Série A at RSSSF

1974
1
Bra
B